Josef Stříbrný (born July 13, 1996) is a Czech professional ice hockey left winger. He is currently playing for HC Mostečtí Lvi of the Czech 2. liga on loan from HC Litvínov.

Stříbrný made his Czech Extraliga debut for HC Litvínov during the 2015–16 season and to date he has played 26 games for the team. He has also had loan spells with HC Most, HC Stadion Litoměřice and HC Baník Sokolov.

References

External links

1996 births
Living people
HC Baník Sokolov players
Czech ice hockey left wingers
HC Litvínov players
HC Most players
Sportspeople from Most (city)
HC Stadion Litoměřice players